Desire Develops an Edge is the second studio album by Kip Hanrahan, released in 1983 on Hanrahan's own label American Clavé and featuring guests including Jerry Gonzalez, Jamaaladeen Tacuma, and Chico Freeman. Initially on vinyl it contained an LP and an EP; the CD release via the German label VeraBra differed in the sequence of the tracks and the song "Late Fall" instead of "The Edge You Always Loved in Me".

Background 
This was the first album Kip created with Jack Bruce and Steve Swallow, both of whom would go on to be on many future Hanrahan albums.

Critical reception 
Le Monde described the album in a review, saying "Desire is a record of jazz rock and salsa the way it should be today: inventive, moving, incisive, surprising. On top of everything else, it's so sensual! ...Jack Bruce gives one of the unforgettable vocal performances of the epoch... Desire Develops an Edge is not the record of the year, 1984 will be the year of Desire"

Track listing

Personnel 
 Kip Hanrahan – direction; percussion (1, 4, 16), vocals (4, 10)
 Molly Farley – vocals (4, 7, 13)
 Jack Bruce – vocals (1–5, 8–11, 13–17), electric bass (9, 13, 16)
 Steve Swallow – electric bass (1, 3, 4, 7, 8, 10, 11, 14), piano (8, 11)
 Jamaaladeen Tacuma – electric bass (1, 4, 17)
 Sérgio Brandão – electric bass (2, 5, 15)
 Arto Lindsay – electric guitar (1–3, 5, 7–10, 14–17), vocals (4)
 Elysee Pyronneau – electric guitar (2–5, 7, 9, 12, 13, 16), vocals (4)
 Alberto Bengolea – electric guitar (2, 5, 9, 14, 16), acoustic guitar (15)
 Jody Harris – electric guitar (3, 14, 17)
 Ti'Plume Ricardo Franck – electric guitar and vocals (4)
 Jean Claude Jean – electric guitar (9, 13)
 John Scofield – acoustic guitar (11)
 Jerry Gonzalez – congas (1, 2, 4, 5, 7, 8, 10, 15), percussion (4), claves (6), trumpet (12)
 Puntilla Orlando Rios – congas (1–4, 7–10, 14, 16), percussion (1, 4, 14, 16), quinto (5, 12), vocals (6), shekere (9)
 Olufemi Claudette Mitchell – shekere (4, 9), vocals (4), percussion (14, 16)
 Milton Cardona – congas (4, 8, 12, 13, 16), shekere (4)
 Frisner Augustin – congas (9), tambou (13, 16)
 Gene Golden - congas (13, 16)
 David Moss – percussion (17)
 Ignacio Berroa – drums (1, 3, 7, 9, 14, 15)
 Anton Fier – drums (2, 3, 5, 7, 15, 17)
 Tico Harry Sylvain – drums (4, 8, 15)
 Hannibal Marvin Peterson – trumpet (13)
 Ricky Ford – tenor saxophone (1, 2, 5, 8, 10, 13, 15)
 John Stubblefield – tenor saxophone (1, 8, 13, 17)
 Ned Rothenberg – tenor saxophone (8)
 Teo Macero – tenor saxophone (13)
 Mario Rivera – baritone saxophone (13)
 John Zorn – alto saxophone (17)

Technical personnel 
 Kip Hanrahan – producer
 Scott Marcus – executive producer
 Jon Fausty - recording and mixing engineer
 David Rodriguez - recording engineer
 Jack Adelman - mastering
 Capoeira Graphics - cover design
 Andy Freeberg - photography

References

1983 albums
Kip Hanrahan albums